"Confusion" was the last single to be released from the Zutons' first album Who Killed...... The Zutons? (2004). It entered the UK Singles Chart at number 37.

The song was used in a UK advertisement for the Peugeot 307 car range during 2005.

Music video
The video depicts the band performing in an abandoned bar while two wine glasses and a corkscrew, among other objects, dance to the song.

Track listing

CD
 "Confusion"
 "Jump Sturdy"

7"
 "Confusion"
 "You Will You Won't"

References

The Zutons songs
2004 singles
2004 songs
Songs written by Dave McCabe